The Bakhvistsqali is a river in western Georgia, located in the region of Guria. It flows into the Supsa and has a length of 42 kilometres.

References
 Abkhazava I., Georgian Soviet Encyclopedia, Vol. 2, p. 254, 1977. 

Guria
Rivers of Georgia (country)
Tributaries of the Supsa